Glutaminase deficiency is a rare genetic disorder that presents in childhood. It is associated with epilepsy and usually results in an early demise.

Presentation

This condition is characterised by refractory seizures, respiratory failure, brain abnormalities and death in the neonatal period.

Genetics

This condition is caused by mutations in the  glutaminase  (GLS) gene. The inheritance of this condition is autosomal recessive. Milder cases have been reported due a mutation in the 5' region of the gene.

Diagnosis

This diagnosis is made by sequencing the GLS gene. There is presently no curative treatment. Management is supportive.

Epidemiology

The prevalence is not known but this is considered to be a rare disease. As of 2019 only seven cases have been reported.

This condition was first described in 2018.

References

Genetic diseases and disorders
Rare syndromes